Osmium iodide refers to compounds of osmium with the formula OsIn.  Several have been mentioned in the literature, but all iodides except the tetraiodide have been verified by X-ray crystallography.

Osmium(I) iodide
Osmium(I) iodide is the iodide of osmium with the formula OsI. It is a metallic grey solid produced by the reaction of osmium tetroxide and hydroiodic acid heated in a water bath for 48 hours in a carbon dioxide atmosphere. This compound is amorphous.

Osmium(II) iodide
Osmium(II) iodide is the iodide of osmium with the formula OsI2. It is a black solid produced by the reaction of osmium tetroxide and hydroiodic acid at 250 °C in nitrogen:
OsO4 + HI → OsI2 + H2O
This compound decomposes in contact with water.

Osmium(III) iodide
Osmium(III) iodide is the iodide of osmium with the formula OsI3. This black solid is produced by heating hexaiodoosmic acid(H2OsI6). This compound is insoluble in water.

Osmium(IV) iodide
What was claimed to be osmium(IV) iodide was produced by the reaction of osmic acid(H4OsO6) and hydroiodic acid. However on attempted reproduction, this substance was found to be dihydroxonium hexaiodoosmate ((H3O+)2OsI62–). When heated this did not form a tetraiodo compound, and instead formed mono, di, and tri-iodo osmium compounds.

References

Osmium compounds
Iodides